Panic Button, LLC is an American video game developer based in Austin, Texas. Founded in late 2007, the studio is best known for their ports of AAA video games from other platforms to the Nintendo Switch console. Panic Button also does contract work on other platforms, including 4K updates for PlayStation 4 Pro and Xbox One X.

History 
Panic Button was founded by Craig Galley, D. Michael Traub, Russell Byrd, and Aaron Smischney. The four had worked together at video game publisher Acclaim Entertainment before joining developer Inevitable Entertainment. Inevitable Entertainment was eventually acquired by Midway Games and renamed Midway Studios Austin, after which the studio was procedurally stripped of its game development duties and was tasked with streamlining Midway's development tools and technology instead. Wishing to return to game development, the four founders left the studio and established Panic Button in Austin, Texas, at the end of 2007. Galley and Traub are still active with the company as of July 2018.

Panic Button started out experimenting with motion-based games, and for the next few years, they developed several exclusive games for the Nintendo Wii and the Kinect peripheral for Xbox 360. However, interpreting the user's intent in motion games proved difficult and unreliable for them. In 2011, Adam Creighton joined Panic Button, becoming a co-owner in the company and its general manager. He instituted a focus change in the studio, wherein it turned towards port development. In 2012, Panic Button collaborated with fellow Austin company Twisted Pixel Games to make their first port for their game Ms. Splosion Man. Porting games became their main source of revenue for the next few years, although they also released their own properties such as  Astro Duel Deluxe in 2017.

The company's Nintendo Switch port of Rocket League made Panic Button better known in the industry in 2017. Their Switch ports of Doom and Wolfenstein II: The New Colossus followed with similar positive responses the next year and turned Panic Button into a studio in demand. The company had started working with the Switch hardware around 2012 (including early development tech), earlier than any other studio, and they work closely with Nintendo and Nvidia. Panic Button sees the source of its success in collaborating closely with the original content makers to ensure faithful ports within the constraints of the hardware, while adding non-gimmicky elements that improve the port, such as including touch or motion controls for the Switch.

To keep a diverse portfolio, Panic Button partnered with Sony to bring the VR title To the Top from Oculus and HTC Vive to PlayStation VR in 2018; more VR ports may come should the opportunity arise. The studio also intends to keep building their own internal properties, saying "We don't plan to reinvent the genres for the games we're making, but we want to create some very tight, well-crafted love letters to these particular genres that we think will be fun and enjoyable and replayable for folks."

Creighton left Panic Button in May 2019 to form his own studio, Enduring Games.

Games developed

References

External links 
 

2007 establishments in Texas
American companies established in 2007
Companies based in Austin, Texas
Privately held companies based in Texas
Video game companies based in Texas
Video game companies established in 2007
Video game development companies